Asthma is a predisposition of the respiratory system in which the airways are predisposed to bronchoconstriction.

Asthma may also refer to:

Occupational asthma, predisposition of the respiratory system caused by occupational hazards
Asthma, a song by P.O.D. from their 2003 album Payable on Death
Asthma (film)
Exercise induced asthma, a sub-type of the long-term condition, Asthma .

See also
Asma (disambiguation)